Wass or WASS may refer to:

People
 Wass de Czege, a Hungarian noble family in Transylvania

In arts and entertainment
 Albert Wass (1908–1998), Hungarian nobleman, forest engineer, novelist, poet and member of the Wass de Czege family
 Ashley Wass (born 1977), British classical pianist
 Chip Wass (born 1965), American illustrator, designer, and animator
 Julian Wass (born 1981), American film composer, producer and electronic musician
 Ted Wass (born 1952), American television director and former actor on the series Soap

In government
 Paul Wass (1925–2020), American politician
 János Wass (fl. 16th century), king of Hungary and Bohemia; illegitimate son of King Louis II
 Douglas Wass (1923–2017), British civil servant

In sport
 Ted Wass (footballer) (1910–1955), English footballer
 Thomas Wass, Nottinghamshire cricketer
 Daniel Wass (born 1989), Danish footballer
 George Wass (1882–1966), English cricketer
 Horace Wass (1903–1969), English sportsman
 Lennart Wass (born 1953), Swedish football manager

In other fields
 Angelitha Wass (fl. 15th–16th century), Hungarian lady's maid of Anne of Foix-Candale
 Niall Wass (born 1969), British businessman

Other uses
 Wass, North Yorkshire, England, United Kingdom
 Dominique Edward Osok Airport, in Indonesia (ICAO code WASS)

See also
 Was (disambiguation)